Sachsen is a Sachsen-class frigate of the German Navy, the lead ship of her class.

Construction and commissioning
Built by Blohm+Voss, Hamburg, Sachsen was the first of the Sachsen class to be launched and then commissioned into the German Navy. She is based at Wilhelmshaven, initially as part of 1. Fregattengeschwader with the other ships of the Sachsen class, and from 9 January 2005 as part of the 2. Fregattengeschwader, which itself became part of the new Einsatzflottille 2 on 27 June 2005.

Service
In August 2004, Sachsen completed a series of live missile firings at the Point Mugu missile launch range off the coast of California that included a total of 11 ESSM and 10 SM-2 Block IIIA missiles. The tests included firings against target drones such as the BQM-74E Chukar III and BQM-34S Firebee I, as well as against missile targets such as the AQM-37C Jayhawk and air-launched Kormoran 1 anti-ship missiles. While serving in Standing NATO Maritime Group 1 in 2004, Sachsen took part in training operations with the United States' aircraft carrier . She was part of Standing NATO Maritime Group 1 in 2007, and in 2009 participated in the UNITAS Gold exercises, during which she took part in the sinking of a target ship, the former destroyer . In July 2012 she deployed as part of Operation Atalanta, combatting piracy off the coast of Somalia. From 26 August 2013 to 14 December 2013 Sachsen was part of Standing NATO Maritime Group 2.

Sachsen deployed from Wilhelmshaven on 9 October 2015 to participate in the NATO exercise "Trident Juncture". Sachsen replaced the Dutch frigate  in Standing Nato Maritime Group 2 on 12 December 2016, serving as the flagship of Admiral Axel Deertz during this time. The frigate  replaced her as flagship of the taskforce in early April 2017. On 5 January 2018 Sachsen was assigned to EU Navfor Med, replacing the frigate .

On June 21, 2018 Sachsen was operating with  near the Arctic Circle when it attempted to fire a SM-2 Block IIIA missile, and it exploded above the ship. The explosion scorched the paint off the bridge and the vertical launch cells battery. Two German sailors suffered minor injuries. After a brief port call in Harstad, Norway, both frigates returned to their homeport of Wilhelmshaven, Germany.

References

External link

Sachsen-class frigates
2001 ships
Ships built in Hamburg
Frigates of Germany